Köler is a German occupational surname, which means "charcoal burner", from the Middle High German kol "(char)coal". Alternative spellings include Köhler, Koeler and Koler. The surname may refer to:

Christoph Köler (1602–1658), German writer
David Köler (1532–1565), German composer
Johann Köler (1826–1899), Estonian painter

See also
Koehl

References

German-language surnames
Surnames of German origin